Not to be confused with Gediminas Kirkilas, another former Prime Minister of Lithuania.

Gediminas Vagnorius (born 10 June 1957) is a Lithuanian politician and signatory of the Act of the Re-Establishment of the State of Lithuania. He served as the Prime Minister of Lithuania, heading the government between 1991 and 1992, and again from 1996 until 1999.

After Lithuania regained its independence in 1990, its temporary currency, the Lithuanian talonas, was popularly known as vagnorkė or vagnorėlis after Vagnorius' name.

References 

  Elections 2000 - Gediminas Vagnorius . Seimas (Parliament) of Lithuania.

1957 births
Living people
Prime Ministers of Lithuania
Vilnius Gediminas Technical University alumni
Members of the Seimas
21st-century Lithuanian politicians